Plectoptera picta, the pictured beetle cockroach, is a species of cockroach in the family Ectobiidae. It is found in Central America and North America.

References

 Atkinson, Thomas H., Philip G. Koehler, and Richard S. Patterson (1991). "Catalog and Atlas of the Cockroaches of North America North of Mexico". Miscellaneous Publications of the Entomological Society of America, no. 78, 1-85.
 Poole, Robert W., and Patricia Gentili, eds. (1997). "Blattodea". Nomina Insecta Nearctica: A Check List of the Insects of North America: vol. 4: Non-Holometabolous Orders, 31-39.

Further reading

 

Cockroaches
Insects described in 1893